Ronette Cort (born 24 May 1979) is a Guyanese former footballer who played as a goalkeeper. She has been a member of the Guyana women's national team.

International career
Cort capped for Guyana at senior level during the 2010 CONCACAF Women's World Cup Qualifying qualification.

References

1979 births
Living people
Women's association football goalkeepers
Guyanese women's footballers
Guyana women's international footballers